Mi Vida is the fourth studio album by French singer Kendji Girac. It was released on 9 October 2020 by Island Def Jam.

Singles
"Habibi" was released as the lead single from the album on 11 June 2020. "Dernier métro" was released as the second single on 28 August 2020. "Évidemment" was released as the third single from the album on 17 December 2020. A remix of "Bebeto" was released as the fourth single from the album on 16 July 2021. "Dans mes bras" was released as the fifth single on 25 August 2021. "Conquistador" was released as the sixth single from the album on 9 December 2021.

Track listing

Charts

Weekly charts

Year-end charts

Certifications

Release history

References

2020 albums
Kendji Girac albums